Halteromyces is a genus of fungi belonging to the family Cunninghamellaceae.

Species:
 Halteromyces radiatus Shipton & Schipper

References

Fungi